Magnat(e) may refer to:

Magnate, in particular
Magnates of Poland and Lithuania
Business magnate 
Magnat (surname)
Magnat (film), 1987 Polish historical film
Magnat,  audiosystem brand by Audiovox
Magnat, beer brand by Dojlidy Brewery
Magnat, beer brand by Obolon CJSC

See also
Magnat-l'Étrange, commune in France
Magnate (singer), part of the Puerto Rican duo Magnate & Valentino. Also a solo singer